There have been 27 Olympic artists who have identified or been identified as lesbian, gay, bisexual, queer, and/or androgynous, or who had been in a same-sex relationship. The first Olympic Games in which an artist now known to be LGBT+ competed was the 1912 Summer Olympics. The first contemporaneously out LGBT+ artists competed in 1924, with the first LGBT+ Olympic medalist in art winning in 1928. The artistic events were not contested after 1948.

Not including demonstration events, 5 of the LGBT+ artists won a medal, with another receiving an honourable mention but no medals (24% of LGBT+ artists). None won a gold medal.

Overview

Key

Tables are default sorted by first Games appearance chronologically, then current surname or common nickname alphabetically, then first name alphabetically. They can be sorted by current surname (where used) or common nickname alphabetically; by country and event alphabetically; by Games chronologically; and by medals as organised in Olympics medals tables.

LGBTQ artists

Notes

References

Sources

Lists of LGBT-related people
LGBT artists